Andre Tjay De Barr (born 13 March 2000) is a Gibraltarian footballer who plays for League One side Wycombe Wanderers and the Gibraltar national football team as a forward.

Club career
De Barr came through the youth system at Lincoln Red Imps, and in early 2015 had a trial at Peterborough United. In 2017 he went on loan to Europa Point to help the newly promoted team in their fight for survival during the 2016–17 season. He played 11 games but could not help the side as they finished bottom of the league. His performances, however, did impress Lincoln manager Julio César Ribas, who opted to use him more often the following season. De Barr won his first senior trophy that September after coming off the bench in the 2017 Pepe Reyes Cup, converting the winning penalty He scored his first senior goal for the Red Imps on 20 February 2018, in a Rock Cup Second Round game against Glacis United. On 29 May 2018 he announced that he would leave the club, signing for rivals Europa in July.

De Barr made his debut for Europa on 12 August 2018, in the 2018 Pepe Reyes Cup game against former club Lincoln Red Imps. He scored an own goal to take the game to penalties, which Europa won to give De Barr his first silverware for the side. After impressing for both his club and national team, in January 2019 it was reported that De Barr had been invited to a trial with an unnamed Portuguese Primeira Liga team, which was later revealed to be Rio Ave. On 19 February, it was revealed that he was on trial with Segunda División side UD Las Palmas. His performances in the latter months of 2018 saw him nominated for "Junior Individual of the Year" at the GBC Sports Awards 2018.

On 21 March 2019, it was revealed that De Barr signed for the 2019–20 season with Spanish club Real Oviedo, being initially assigned to their B-side. The news was confirmed by Europa FC on Twitter later that day. He made his debut as a substitute on 25 August, but was unable to prevent his team losing 4–3 on the opening day of the season against Peña Deportiva. However, his first season at the club was curtailed by a meniscus injury to his left leg in December 2019. With football disrupted due to the COVID-19 pandemic, De Barr returned to limited training on 27 May 2020 with Oviedo's B team. However, continued uncertainty over the return to football in Spain led to De Barr re-joining Lincoln Red Imps on 1 September 2020. Upon his return, he was utilised primarily as a winger with Kike Gómez the lone striker, but his performances attracted the attention of Wycombe Wanderers who invited him for a trial in July 2021.

He signed a one-year deal with Wycombe on 4 August 2021. On 24 August, he made his debut as a substitute against Stevenage in the EFL Cup, scoring a 94th minute equaliser to take the game into extra time before scoring the winning penalty to take the Chairboys through. His style of play and build earned him the nickname "Tevez" from the Wycombe squad.

On 11 February 2022, he joined Eastleigh on a 30 day loan. He made just four appearances for the Spitfires before picking up a serious injury before returning to his parent club.

On 29 December 2022 he came on as a second half substitute, in place of Ali Al-Hamadi, for his fifth appearance of the season for Wycombe away to Plymouth Argyle at Home Park, but immediately following the full time whistle he collapsed to the ground and, following medical attention on the pitch, was taken to hospital where he was later released. He returned to the first team later in January, and scored his first league goal for the club on 11 March 2023 against Burton Albion

International career
De Barr has represented Gibraltar internationally at youth groups from under-16 through to under-21 level. He made his senior debut on 25 March 2018, coming on as a late substitute against Latvia and winning the free kick that Liam Walker converted to give Gibraltar a famous 1–0 win. De Barr subsequently became a regular in the side during their UEFA Nations League campaign, scoring his first international goal on 16 November to break the deadlock against Armenia making him the youngest scorer in the tournament's history as of June 2020. After scoring a penalty against Latvia on 1 September 2021, he became the joint-record scorer for Gibraltar alongside Lee Casciaro.

Career statistics

Club

International

International goals
''Gibraltar score listed first, score column indicates score after each De Barr goal.

Honours
Lincoln Red Imps
Gibraltar Premier Division / Gibraltar National League: 2017–2018, 2020–21
Pepe Reyes Cup: 2017
Rock Cup: 2021
Europa
Pepe Reyes Cup: 2018

References

External links
 

2000 births
Living people
Gibraltarian footballers
Association football midfielders
Europa F.C. players
Europa Point F.C. players
Lincoln Red Imps F.C. players
Real Oviedo players
Real Oviedo Vetusta players
Wycombe Wanderers F.C. players
Eastleigh F.C. players
Gibraltar international footballers
Gibraltar Premier Division players
Gibraltar under-21 international footballers
Gibraltar youth international footballers
Gibraltarian expatriate footballers
Expatriate footballers in Spain
Expatriate footballers in England
English Football League players
National League (English football) players
Gibraltarian expatriate sportspeople in England
Gibraltarian expatriate sportspeople in Spain